Dunaújvárosi Kohász KA or DKKA (in English: Dunaújvárosi Kohász Handball Academy), formerly known as Dunaferr, is a Hungarian women's handball club from Dunaújváros, that plays in the  Nemzeti Bajnokság I.

History

Dunaferr
The team enjoyed their best spell between the mid-1990s and the mid-2000s, during which period they won five Hungarian championship and five Hungarian Cup titles, and set a unique record of winning all three major continental competitions. Kohász, as the fans call the club, first won the EHF Cup Winners' Cup in 1995 and captured the EHF Cup title three years later.

In 1999 they lifted the EHF Champions League trophy as well, after beating Slovenian side Krim Ljubljana in the finals. Dunaferr, playing in front of their fanatic fans, have secured a two goal advantage for the rematch, which ended in a 26–26 draw, and that was just enough for the Hungarians to celebrate a famous success.  To make the silverware collection complete, they also took the EHF Champions Trophy in that year.

Dunaújvárosi Kohász KA 

Following the decision of the Dunaújváros City Council on 28 October 2010, Bojana Radulovics has been named to manage the women's section of the newly forming handball academy, which is set to open in September 2011 and will run in co-operation with the College of Dunaújváros. The Academy is operated by Dunaújvárosi Főiskola – Dunaújvárosi Kézilabda Akadémia Nonprofit Kft. (DF-DKA).
In the autumn of 2011 Eszter Mátéfi joined the staff.  
Dunaferr NKSE could not undertake the operation of the NB I adult team longer, so it was a real danger that professional handball in Dunaújváros would totally disappear. The DF-DKA announced that it will take over the senior team and enter it in the NB I/B championship. The Hungarian Handball Federation did not support this, but the club has offered the 12th place in the first division. The team started the 2012/2013 season as Dunaújvárosi Kohász Kézilabda Akadémia.

Crest, colours, supporters

Naming history
1979–1989: Dunaújvárosi Kohász SE
1989–2004: Dunaferr SE
2004–2009: Dunaferr NK
2009–2010: Dunaújvárosi NKKSE
2010–2012: Dunaújvárosi Regale Klíma
2012–present: Dunaújvárosi Kohász Kézilabda Akadémia

Club crest

Kit manufacturers and Shirt sponsor
The following table shows in detail Dunaújváros kit manufacturers and shirt sponsors by year:

Kits

Supporters and rivalries 
The supporters of the club are based in Dunaújváros, in western part and capital of Fejér County, Hungary.

Dunaújvárosi Kohász KA's rival is the neighbouring club Fehérvár KC and games between the clubs are considered as the "Fejér megyei derbi".

Honours

Domestic competitions
Nemzeti Bajnokság I (National Championship of Hungary)
 Champions (5): 1997–98, 1998–99, 2000–01, 2002–03, 2003–04
 Runners-up (4): 1996–97, 2001–02, 2004–05, 2007–08
 Third place (4): 1995–96, 1999–00, 2005–06, 2006–07

Magyar Kupa (National Cup of Hungary)
 Winners (5): 1997–98, 1998–99, 1999–00, 2001–02, 2003–04
 Finalists (4): 1993–94, 2002–03, 2004–05, 2007–08

European competitions
EHF Champions League:
Winners: 1999
Semifinalists: 2004, 2005

EHF Cup Winners' Cup:
Winners: 1995

EHF Cup
Winners: 1998, 2016
Finalists: 2003
Semifinalists: 2008

EHF Champions Trophy:
Winners: 1999
Third Placed: 1998
Fourth Placed: 1995

Arena
Name: Dunaújvárosi Sportcsarnok
City: Dunaújváros, Hungary
Capacity:  1,200 spectators
Address: H-2400 Dunaújváros, Eszperantó út 2–4.

Current squad
Squad for the 2022–23 season

 Head coach:  Tamás Rapatyi
 Assistant coach: Szabolcs Törő
 Goalkeeper coach: Zsolt Perger
 Fitness coach: Tibor Horváth

 Doctor: Viktor Úr, MD
 Masseur: Lajos Sipos
 Technical director: Anita Györgyné Oblisz

Goalkeepers
 16  Gabrijela Bartulović
 90  Viktória Oguntoye
Left Wingers
 34  Anita Kazai
 40  Beatrix Krupják-Molnár
 8  Neszta Fodor
Right Wingers
 73  Viktória Kukucska
 72  Rebeka Arany
 43  Alexandra Agócs
Line Players
 6  Saskia Weisheitel 
 95  Viktória Nick
 24  Gabriella Matucza
 91  Petra Gajdos

Left Backs
 28  Luca Poczetnyik
 17  Petra Horváth
 51  Petra Lakatos
Central Backs
 13  Babett Szalai
 19  Johanna Farkas
 49  Panna Borgyos
Right Backs
 14  Noémi Kecskés
 5  Kata Farkas

Transfers
Transfers for the 2023–24 season

 Joining
  Alexa Wéninger (GK) (from  National Academy of Handball)
  Fruzsina Bouti (CB) (from  Kisvárdai KC)
  Sára Paróczy (LP) (from  Érd HC)

 Leaving
  Johanna Farkas (CB) (to  MTK Budapest)
  Luca Poczetnyik (LB) (to  MTK Budapest)
  Gabrijela Bartulović (GK) (to  Debrecen)

Previous Squads

Recent seasons

Seasons in Nemzeti Bajnokság I: 41
Seasons in Nemzeti Bajnokság I/B: 4 
Seasons in Nemzeti Bajnokság II: 8

In European competition

Participations in Champions League: 8x
Participations in EHF Cup: 10x
Participations in Cup Winners' Cup: 5x

Notable former players

Goalkeepers
  Andrea Farkas
  Viktória Oguntoye
  Katalin Pálinger
  Anikó Meksz
  Ágnes Triffa
  Irina Sirina
  Krisztina Kerner
  Erzsébet Baranyi
  Paula Ungureanu
  Mihaela Blaga
  Sanela Knezović
  Marianna Gubova
  Katarina Tomasevic
Right wings
  Beatrix Balogh
  Zsuzsanna Pálffy
  Rita Meggyes
  Zsuzsanna Lovász
  Fruzsina Dávid-Azari
  Enikő Tóth
  Melinda Berta
Right backs
  Bojana Radulovics
  Helga Németh
  Rita Borók
  Ibolya Mehlmann
  Nikolett Brigovácz
  Anett Sopronyi
  Luca Szekerczés
  Klára Gát
  Anna Kovács
  Katrin Klujber
  Dominika Mrmolja
Line players
  Beáta Bohus
  Erzsébet Kocsis
  Anita Kulcsár
  Rita Borbás
  Barbara Balogh
  Tatiana Sologub
  Itana Čavlović
  Sanja Dabevska
Playmakers
  Bernadett Ferling
  Olívia Kamper
  Krisztina Pigniczki
  Beáta Siti
  Tamara Tilinger
  Gabriella Gáspár
Left backs
  Anita Bulath
  Eszter Mátéfi
  Judit Simics
  Rita Deli
  Gabriella Kindl
  Ágnes Farkas
  Hortenzia Szrnka
  Auguszta Mátyás
  Renáta Mörtel
  Eszter Laluska
  Krisztina Triscsuk
  Anita Oblisz
  Ćamila Mičijević
  Svetlana Obućina
  Jana Šustková
Left wings
  Ivett Nagy
  Gabriella Takács
  Melinda Rácz-Vincze
  Ildikó Erdősi
  Erika Sávolt
  Éva Erdősi
  Jelena Berciuniene

Coaches

  László Sándorfi (1979)
  Béla Herczeg (1983–1985)
  Csaba Árva (1989–1992)
  Ervin Horváth (1992–1993)
  István Pergel (1993–1995)
  Barabás Pánczél (1995–1996)
  András Kajcsa (1980–1982, 1986–1989, 1996–1997)
  Gyula Zsiga (1997–2000)
  Péter Kovács (2006–2007)
  Vilmos Imre (2007–2008)
  Tamás Rapatyi (2008–2010, 2022–present)
  Szilárd Kiss (2000–2006, 2010–2011)
  Ervin Dankó (2011)
  István Gulyás (2011–2012)
  Eszter Mátéfi (2012–2015)
  Zdravko Zovko (2015–2017)
  László György (2017–2020)
  Attila Vágó (2020–2022)

Dunaújvárosi Kohász KA II
Dunaújvárosi Kohász KA II is the junior team of Dunaújvárosi Kohász KA women's handball club. They compete in the Nemzeti Bajnokság I/B, the second-tier league in Hungary. Although they play in the same league system as their senior team, rather than a separate league, they are ineligible for promotion to the Nemzeti Bajnokság I, since junior teams cannot play in the same division as their senior side.

References

External links
 Official website
 
 Hungarian Handball Federation Database
 European Handball Federation Database
 History of Hungarian handball
Coaches of the team

Hungarian handball clubs
Dunaújváros
Sports clubs established in 2011
2011 establishments in Hungary